In the Battle of Cedynia or Zehden, an army of Mieszko I of Poland defeated forces of Hodo or Odo I of Lusatia on 24 June 972, near the Oder river. Whether or not the battle actually took place near the modern-day town of Cedynia is disputed in modern scholarship.

Mieszko I, Poland's first documented ruler based in Greater Poland, had successfully campaigned in the Cedynia area, then a West Slavic tribal territory also coveted by Holy Roman Emperor Otto I and German nobles. While Mieszko's differences with Otto I were settled by an alliance and payment of tribute to the latter, the nobles whom Otto I had invested with the former Saxon Eastern March, most notably Odo I, challenged Mieszko's gains. The battle was to determine the possession of the area between Mieszko and Odo. Records of the battle are sparse, it was briefly described by the chronicler Thietmar of Merseburg (975−1018), whose father participated in the battle (Chronicon II.19).

Background

  
About 937 the Saxon margrave Gero had conquered vast territories east of the Elbe River, where he subdued the tribes of the Polabian Slavs. The German forces thereby reached the Oder River and the western border of the young Polish country. After several clashes of arms the conflict for the present was settled by an agreement in 963 whereafter Duke Mieszko had to pay a recurrent tribute to Emperor Otto.

Upon Gero's death in 965, his vast Marca Geronis was divided into several smaller marches, while the power in the area was exercised by unchecked warlords. Duke Mieszko took the occasion to capture the lightly defended and economically important estuary of the Oder on the Baltic Sea, in order to secure his influence in Pomerania up to Wolin. In turn Odo I had been vested with the Saxon Eastern March (the later March of Lusatia) by Emperor Otto I and was responsible for gathering tribute of the tribes which were Mieszko's point of interest.

The margrave wanted to extend his territory and influence, he finally gathered his forces and decided to attack. He was sure of victory; his raid was a private conflict, against the agreements made by the Emperor, who at the same time struggled to secure his rule in the Kingdom of Italy. However, against Odo's expectations, the battle was won by Mieszko.

The battle as reported by Thietmar
The only more-or-less contemporary account of the battle is chapter 19 of the second book of Thietmar of Merseburg's Chronicon, consisting of three sentences:

Aftermath

After Emperor Otto I returned to Germany, he mediated a truce between the belligerents at the Hoftag diet of 973 in Quedlinburg, according to which Mieszko was obliged to transfer his minor son Bolesław as a hostage to the Imperial court. Nevertheless, the Emperor died a few weeks later and the conflict with the Saxon margraves continued to smoulder. After Mieszko had interfered in the conflict of Otto's son and successor Emperor Otto II with the Bavarian duke Henry the Wrangler, German forces again attacked Poland without success in 979.

The relations with the Empire improved upon Mieszko's marriage with Oda of Haldensleben, daughter of Margrave Dietrich of the Northern March.

Modern era

In 1945, the implementation of the Oder-Neisse line resulted in the transfer of the town of Zehden from the German province of Brandenburg to the People's Republic of Poland. The town was renamed Cedynia. Contemporary Polish historiography, tasked to justify the post-war borders, turned the encounter of 972 into the first medieval battle between Poles and Germans.

Largely unknown in Poland before World War II, the battle was instrumentalized by post-war Polish propaganda to justify the Oder-Neisse line, which in 1945 made former German Cedynia Poland's westernmost town, and rendered into a German-Polish battle to underline the doctrine of "eternal German-Polish enmity". With the fall of Communism, the propagandistic approach was discarded, yet the battle retained some prominence and is included in modern Polish curricula.

The mosaics on the hill's foot show white knights encircling and defeating black knights. The monument was erected in 1972 to commemorate the 1000th anniversary of the battle, which was celebrated in the town by people from all regions of Poland, including high-ranking politicians, and accompanied by a large youth festival, "Cedynia 72".

The lower Oder area, Cedynia and the associated battle in particular, had also played a prominent role in the 1000th anniversary of the Polish state in 1966. The story of the battle was popularized by various means: rallies, monuments, press reports, popular science, travel guides, prosaic and lyrical works, movies, a dedicated medal, post stamps and envelope editions, even special match box designs.

Recent reassessment has resulted in doubts whether the battle had taken place near modern-day Cedynia. According to Pawel Migdalski, "Cedynia has lost its propagandistic value and is now just one of several small border towns". The memory of the battle is now upheld in a non-political fashion, by an annual festival and re-enactments.

The Battle of Cedynia is commemorated on the Tomb of the Unknown Soldier, Warsaw, with the inscription "CEDYNIA 24 VI 972"

See also
 History of Poland
 Battles of Medieval Poland
 Ostsiedlung

Sources

References

Bibliography

External links
Cedynia, Poland website (till 1945 Zehden), showing earlier spellings of town
Battle of Cidini by Thietmar on Cedynia website – Polish language

Cedynia 972
Battles of the Middle Ages
970s conflicts
972
10th century in Poland